Eulogio Robles Pinochet (1831 – 7 March 1891) was a Chilean military officer. He participated in the War of the Pacific and in the Chilean Civil War of 1891.

Civil War

During the 1891 Civil War Pinochet supported President José Manuel Balmaceda who appointed Pinochet as Deputy Chief of the General Staff. Pinochet took part in several battles. After the Battle of Huara on 17 February 1891 he was appointed commander of a division. He was defeated at the Battle of Pozo Almonte on 6 March 1891 and was seriously wounded. He was admitted to a Red Cross field hospital but was found by  the revolutionary rebels and executed.

He posthumously received the rank of brigadier general .

References

1831 births
1891 deaths
People from Bío Bío Province
Chilean people of Spanish descent
Robles
Chilean people of French descent
Chilean Army officers
Chilean military personnel of the War of the Pacific
People of the Chilean Civil War of 1891 (Balmacedistas)